Maraniona lavinii is a species of legume in the family Fabaceae, and was recently assigned to the informal monophyletic Pterocarpus clade of the Dalbergieae. It is endemic to the Marañón Valley in northern Peru. It is the only member of the genus Maraniona and is closely related to the genus Tipuana.

References

Dalbergieae
Monotypic Fabaceae genera